"Stopping by Woods on a Snowy Evening" is a poem by Robert Frost, written in 1922, and published in 1923 in his New Hampshire volume. Imagery, personification, and repetition are prominent in the work. In a letter to Louis Untermeyer, Frost called it "my best bid for remembrance".

Analysis
The text of the poem reflects the thoughts of a lone wagon driver (the narrator), pausing at dusk in his travel to watch snow falling in the woods. It ends with him reminding himself that, despite the loveliness of the view, "I have promises to keep, / And miles to go before I sleep."

Background 
Frost wrote the poem in June 1922 at his house in Shaftsbury, Vermont. He had been up the entire night writing the long poem "New Hampshire" from the poetry collection of the same name, and had finally finished when he realized morning had come. He went out to view the sunrise and suddenly got the idea for "Stopping by Woods on a Snowy Evening". He wrote the new poem "about the snowy evening and the little horse as if I'd had a hallucination" in just "a few minutes without strain."

Structure and style 
The poem is written in iambic tetrameter in the Rubaiyat stanza created by Edward FitzGerald, who adopted the style from Hakim Omar Khayyam, the 12th-century Persian poet and mathematician. Each verse (save the last) follows an AABA rhyming scheme, with the following verse's A line rhyming with that verse's B line, which is a chain rhyme (another example is the terza rima used in Dante's Inferno.) Overall, the rhyme scheme is AABA BBCB CCDC DDDD.

The poem begins with a moment of quiet introspection, which is reflected in the soft sounds of w's and th's, as well as double ll's. In the second stanza, harder sounds — like k and qu — begin to break the whisper. As the narrator's thought is disrupted by the horse in the third stanza, a hard g is used.

Comma story
An oft-repeated story holds that Frost wrote the first line of the last stanza without an Oxford comma: "The woods are lovely, dark and deep" and an editor or typesetter added a comma: "The woods are lovely, dark, and deep".  As can be seen (and as is pointed out by English literature teachers), the presence of the comma makes a significant change in the meaning of the line: "the woods are lovely because they are dark and deep" becomes "the woods are lovely, and dark, and deep."  Frost is said to have ordered that it be removed.  After his death, another editor (re)inserted it, in what critic Evan Lang Pandya calls a "gross besmirching of Frost's intention that has gone down as one of twentieth-century editing's foremost quibbles."

Notable usage
In the early morning of November 23, 1963, Sid Davis of Westinghouse Broadcasting reported the arrival of President John F. Kennedy's casket at the White House. Since Frost was one of the President's favorite poets, Davis concluded his report with a passage from this poem but was overcome with emotion as he signed off.

At the funeral of former Canadian prime minister Pierre Trudeau, on October 3, 2000, his eldest son, Justin, rephrased the last stanza of this poem in his eulogy: "The woods are lovely, dark and deep. He has kept his promises and earned his sleep."

Jawaharlal Nehru, the first Prime Minister of India, towards his later years, kept a book of Robert Frost close to him, even at his bedside table as he lay dying. One page of the book featured the poem "Stopping by Woods on a Snowy Evening", and the last four lines were underlined.

The poem was set to music by Randall Thompson as part of Frostiana.

The poem, and specifically its last stanza, was featured prominently in US President Joe Biden’s autobiography “Promises to Keep”, the name of which is derived from the third-to-last line of the poem.

References

External links
 
 .  Text of the poem, along with the rhyming pattern.
 .  Discussion and analysis of the poem.

Poetry by Robert Frost
1923 poems
American poems
Modernist poems